The Glass Agency is a 1998 Iranian drama film written and directed by Ebrahim Hatamikia, and one of his most successful works and one of the most popular and controversial films of post-revolutionary Iranian cinema.

The Glass Agency is set in a travel agency where an armed veteran takes hostages after failing to raise enough money for his injured comrade to travel abroad for medical treatment. The film candidly reveals some of the major fault lines in Iranian society today. With its complex message of sympathy for the veterans and criticism of those who exploit their status for political purposes, the film has won praise from conservatives and reformists alike.

Plot
Two veterans of Iran-Iraq war, Abbas and his wartime commander Kazem are the main protagonists of the film. Abbas comes to Tehran to seek medical treatment for a war injury. Kazem wants to help Abbas as the doctor recommends that he should go abroad for the operation. However, it is almost New Year's Eve, and arranging a flight becomes difficult. Kazem is suffering from hegemony which is seen in the postwar society. The problems they encounter make Kazem lose his temper, and he ends up taking a whole travel agency hostage.

Cast
 Parviz Parastui as Haj Kazem
 Reza Kianian as Salahshoor
 Habib Rezaei as Abbas Heydari
Bita Badran as Narges
 Asghar Naghizadeh as Asghar
 Ghasem Zareh as Ahmad Kuhi
 Behrouz Shoeibi as Salam
 Farshid Zarei Fard as Agency Manager
 Majid Moshiri
 Ezzatollah Mehravaran
 Nasrin Nakisa
 Mehrdad Falahatgar
 Mohammad Hatami
 Sadegh Safai

Reception

Accolades 
At the 16th Fajr International Film Festival, The film won both Best Film and Audience Choice of Best Film, making it the first film in The history of cinema of Iran to win the latter. The Glass Agency also won nine Crystal Simorgh awards and a Diploma Honorary including:
 Best Film
 Best Director (Ebrahim Hatamikia)
 Best Screenplay (Ebrahim Hatamikia)
 Best Actor (Parviz Parastui)
 Best Supporting Actor (Reza Kianian)
 Best Supporting Actor Diploma Honorary (Habib Rezaei)
 Best Supporting Actress (Bita Badran)
 Best Original Score (Majid Entezami)
 Best Editor (Hayedeh Safiyari)
 Audience Choice of Best Film

and It was nominated in four other categories including:

 Best Cinematography (Aziz Saati)
 Best Sound Editing (Mohsen Roshan)
 Best Makeup (Mehrdad Mirkyani)
 Best Production Design (Hamidreza Charkchyan)

References

Further reading

External links
 
 
 
 
 

1998 drama films
1998 films
Iranian drama films
Films directed by Ebrahim Hatamikia
1990s Persian-language films
Films whose director won the Best Directing Crystal Simorgh
Crystal Simorgh for Best Film winners
Crystal Simorgh for Audience Choice of Best Film winners
Films whose writer won the Best Screenplay Crystal Simorgh